Adam Ashe (born 24 July 1993 in Glasgow) is a former Scotland international rugby union player and now rugby union coach. He is the Assistant Coach for the Stirling Wolves. He previously played for the LA Giltinis of Major League Rugby in the MLR; and for Glasgow Warriors.

He played at the either number 8 or flanker.

Rugby Union career

Amateur career

Ashe, a product of Alva Academy, has played rugby for Hillfoots and Stirling County

In 2016, he turned out for Ayr in the Scottish Premiership.

Ashe has been drafted to Stirling County in the Scottish Premiership for the 2017–18 season.

Professional career

Ashe was named as an Elite Development Player in 2011, being attached to Glasgow Warriors.

He earned his first cap for Glasgow, coming off the bench in the 78th minute against the Ospreys on 14 September 2012. He is Glasgow Warrior No. 205. He was also named on the bench a week later, but was not used in the 27–10 victory over Connacht.

In addition to playing for Glasgow Warriors, Ashe played in the Super 6 tournament for Stirling County.

After leaving the Warriors he played 17 times for the LA Giltinis. He announced his retirement from playing in July 2022 after a neck injury.

International career

Ashe played for the Scotland under-17's team at the Wellington International Festival in 2010, as well as travelling to Valladolid, Spain as a member in a development training squad.

He also featured in the Scottish national sevens team for the 2011–12 season, playing in all nine tournament on the Sevens circuit.

The following year, Ashe was named in the Scotland under-18's squad for the 2011 European Under-18 Rugby Union Championship.

In 2013, he played for the Scotland under-20's team in every Six Nations Under 20s Championship match, which included a man of the match performance against Ireland under-20's. Ashe gained a further five caps for the U20s side in the 2013 IRB Junior World Championship, where Scotland under-20s finished 10th.

On 3 April 2014, Ashe was named the recipient for the John McPhail scholarship in 2014. However, midway through his scholarship, Ashe was called up by new Scotland Head Coach Vern Cotter, for the Scottish national side's test match with South Africa. He started that match at Number 8, playing the full 80 minutes.

Coaching career

He was a defence coach with the UCLA Bruins rugby union side in his time in Los Angeles.

Just three days after Ashe announced his playing career ended, he was announced as the Super 6 side Stirling Wolves assistant coach.

Business career

He is now the Business Club Manager at Glasgow Warriors, taking over from Jim Taylor MBE.

References

External links
 Adam Ashe Glasgow Warriors profile
 Adam Ashe Scotland profile
 

1993 births
Living people
Ayr RFC players
Glasgow Warriors players
Hillfoots RFC players
LA Giltinis players
Rugby union flankers
Rugby union number eights
Rugby union players from Livingston, West Lothian
Scotland international rugby union players
Scottish rugby union players
Stirling County RFC players